USS S-27 (SS-132) was a S-class submarine of the United States Navy.

Construction and commissioning
S-27′s construction was authorized in March 1917, and her keel was laid down on 11 April 1919 by Bethlehem Shipbuilding Corporation's Fore River Shipyard in Quincy, Massachusetts. She was launched on 18 October 1922, sponsored by Mrs. Frank Baldwin, and commissioned at Groton, Connecticut, on 22 January 1924.

Service history
Based at New London, Connecticut, through 1924, S-27 transferred to the Pacific in 1925, and, after exercises in the Hawaiian Islands during the spring of 1925, arrived at her new homeport, San Diego, California, in June 1925. She was based in Southern California until 1931 and, except for fleet maneuvers, operated primarily off that coast. Fleet maneuvers, exercises, and Fleet Problems took her to the west coast of Central America, to the Panama Canal Zone, into the Caribbean Sea, and to Hawaii.

In 1931, S-27 was transferred to Hawaii, and on 23 February 1931 she arrived at Pearl Harbor, Hawaii, from which she operated until 16 June 1939, when she departed for San Diego. She arrived there on 27 June 1939 and resumed operations off the coast of Southern California, conducting exercises and tests, primarily for the Underwater Sound Training School. In late November 1941, she proceeded to Mare Island, California, where she began an overhaul.

World War II
S-27 still was undergoing overhaul when the United States entered World War II with the Japanese attack on Pearl Harbor of 7 December 1941. After completion of her overhaul, she stood out of San Francisco Bay on 23 January 1942 and headed south. On 26 January 1942 she arrived at San Diego, and where resumed operations for the Underwater Sound Training School, which she continued into the spring of 1942. Then ordered north to the Aleutian Islands, she departed San Diego on 20 May 1942, proceeded to Port Angeles, Washington, and then continued on to the waters of the Territory of Alaska, where she commenced patrol operations.

On 12 June 1942, a little over a week after the beginning of the Aleutian Islands campaign, S-27 put into Dutch Harbor on Amaknak Island off Unalaska in the Aleutian islands, took on provisions, refueled, and then headed west with orders to patrol in the Kuluk Bay area on the northeastern side of Adak Island and reconnoiter Constantine Harbor on the coast of Amchitka. On the night of 16–17 June 1942, she received orders to move to Kiska. On 18 June 1942, she reconnoitered Constantine Harbor, found no signs of enemy activity in the evacuated village there, and moved on to round the southern end of Amchitka, from which she would proceed to Kiska. In mid-afternoon on 18 June 1942, she rounded East Cape.

Grounding and loss

When S-27 surfaced on the evening of 18 June 1942, fog obscured her position. The fog prevented her crew from detecting that she was drifting. At midnight, she got underway slowly on one engine and continued to charge on the other. Soon after 00:43 on 19 June 1942, her crew sighted breakers about  forward of her bow. "Back emergency" orders were given, but seconds later she grounded on rocks off St. Makarius Point.

Waves bumped S-27 violently against the rocks, rolling her 10° to 15° on each side. Her engines continued at "back emergency", but a submerged rock held her firmly. Her crew dumped fuel to lighten her and continued efforts to back off the rocks, but the lightened submarine only swung harder against the rocks. Her starboard screw struck a rock and was disabled. S-27′s crew attempted to force her ahead to clear the stern, but she only moved about  forward before the rocks again held her fast. Her crew sounded the immediate area, but found no passage. She transmitted the first of six distress signals at 01:15, but Dutch Harbor received only one of them, and it did not give her position.

By 03:30, the pounding of the sea had increased, and S-27 commanding officer, Lieutenant H. L. Jukes, made plans to move the greater part of her crew off, and her crew set up a ferry system, using a rubber boat and lines rigged between the submarine and the beach. Men, provisions, clothing, guns, and medical supplies were transferred safely to Amchitka. By 11:00, all but six of her crew — Jukes and five others — were ashore. The men still aboard destroyed S-27s equipment and burned her classified material. By 15:30, S-27′s side plating was loose and her torpedo room was flooding and three of the remaining men went ashore. At 15:50, the last three men — the radioman, the executive officer, and Jukes — left the submarine.

S-27′s crew spent the night of 19–20 June 1942 in an unsheltered cove. On 20 June 1942, the crew set up camp at Constantine Harbor, using buildings and heating equipment there which had survived a Japanese bombing. By 21 June 1942, the camp was fully organized, with established routines, including sentries and lookouts. Trips to and from the cove continued for three days. S-27 crewmembers reboarded her on 21 and 22 June 1942 to take off more supplies, but thereafter, the presence of poisonous chlorine gas due to the reaction of seawater with her battery cells precluded further visits.

On 24 June 1942, a U.S. Navy PBY Catalina flying boat piloted by Lieutenant, junior grade, Julius A. Raven, USNR, on a routine flight spotted the activity at Constantine Harbor, landed, and took off 15 of the survivors. On 25 June 1942, three planes arrived to take off the remainder. The men destroyed all guns they had salvaged from S-27 before they departed, leaving behind nothing except S-27′s abandoned wreck and canned provisions, blankets, and winter clothing.

References

External links
On Eternal Patrol: USS S-27

1922 ships
1942 in Alaska
Maritime incidents in June 1942
Ships built in Quincy, Massachusetts
Ships of the Aleutian Islands campaign
Shipwrecks of the Alaska coast
S-27
United States submarine accidents
S-27, USS
World War II shipwrecks in the Pacific Ocean
World War II submarines of the United States